Héctor de Pignatelli y Colonna, 3rd Duke of Monteleone (1574–1622) was viceroy of Catalonia from 1603 to 1611, and in 1610 took the decision to expel the Spanish Moriscos born and living in Spain who were not willing to relinquish their Islamic faith.

Born in 1574, Monteleon was the son and heir of Camilo Pignatelli y Folch de Cardona, 2nd Duke of Monteleon (died 1583), son of Ettore Pignatelli e Caraffa, 1st Duke of Monteleone, by his first wife, Diana Folch de Cardona y Gonzaga (daughter of Pedro Folch de Cardona, 3rd Count of Colisano, and Susanna Gonzaga). His mother was Girolama Colonna y d'Aragona, a daughter of Ascanio Colonna di Paliano, 1st Count of Tagliacozzo (1500–1557) by his marriage to  Giovanna d'Aragona. He inherited the dukedom at the age of nine, on his father's death.

Monteleon's paternal grandfather, who had been viceroy of Sicily from 1517 to 1534, had been elevated to the title of "Duke of Monteleone" by Charles V, Holy Roman Emperor, on 29 March 1527.

Monteleon married Caterina Caracciolo y Mendoza, a daughter of Carlo Caracciolo, 6th Count of Sant'Angelo, and Ana de Mendoza, but they had no sons. When he died in 1622 he was succeeded by his daughter Girolama Pignatelli y Caracciolo, who became Duchess of Monteleone. She married Fabrizio Pignatelli, 3rd Prince of Noia, and in due course passed her father's ducal title on to her son Ettore, who became 5th Duke of Monteleone and 4th Prince of Noia.

The current Duke of Monteleone is Jose Maria Pignatelli de Aragon y Burgos, a Spanish subject and a Grandee of Spain.

References

http://www.comuni-italiani.it/071/032/
http://monteleonedipuglia.com/benvenuti.html

1574 births
1622 deaths
16th-century Italian nobility
17th-century Italian nobility
Dukes of Spain
Viceroys of Catalonia